This is a list of current German supermarket chains.

German supermarket chains

See also

List of supermarket chains
 Indian grocery online in Germany

References

Germany
 
Supermarkets